not to be confused with the nearby Zemplén Mountains

The Zemplín Mountains is a small mountain range in southeastern Slovakia, geologically part of the Mátra-Slanec Area of the Inner Western Carpathians.

The range of about 101 square kilometers is near the border of Hungary and its Tokaj wine region.  The highest mountain of the range is Rozhladňa (469 meters). An important river is Roňava which also forms the border with Hungary; another river with its headwaters here is the Bodrog.

Mountain ranges of Slovakia
Mountain ranges of the Western Carpathians